Vizin (pronounced: vision) is an American drag queen and singer based in Los Angeles.

Background 

A member of the Arikara tribe, Vizin moved to Los Angeles from North Dakota, where she lived at the Fort Berthold Reservation, part of the Three Affiliated Tribes. She began her career in drag in the year 2007, where she took part in her first gig.

In 2016, she released a single titled "I Was Born This Way". It is a remake of the 1975 song by Valentino.

Vizin is two-spirit.

Discography

Charted singles

References 

21st-century Native Americans
American dance musicians
American drag queens
Arikara people
LGBT Native Americans
American LGBT musicians
LGBT people from North Dakota
Musicians from North Dakota
Native American musicians
Two-spirit people

Living people
Year of birth missing (living people)